Peter Michael Nevill (born 13 October 1985) is an Australian former cricketer who played 17 Tests and 9 T20 internationals for Australia. He also represented New South Wales and the Melbourne Stars, having previously played for the Melbourne Renegades and the Sydney Sixers. He was Australia's regular Test wicket-keeper from the second test of 2015 Ashes series until being dropped in November 2016. He made his Twenty20 International debut for Australia against South Africa on 4 March 2016. He retired in April 2022.

Domestic career

Playing as a wicket-keeper, Nevill played for the Australian under-19 cricket team, and made his first-class début for New South Wales against Victoria at the Melbourne Cricket Ground in February 2009. In that match, Nevill made 18 and 0 and took one catch. In March 2012, he was called up to the Australian squad during the team's tour of the West Indies, in place of Brad Haddin to tend to his sick daughter, Mia, although he did not play a game on the tour.

On 16 January 2017, Nevill was hit in the face by a cricket bat during the 2016–17 Big Bash League match between the Melbourne Renegades and the Adelaide Strikers. The bat slipped out of the hands of Brad Hodge and hit Nevill breaking his cheekbone.

2017–18 season

Nevill played for New South Wales in the 2017–18 JLT One-Day Cup. On 8 October, Nevill equalled the record for the most dismissals by a wicket-keeper in a List A game in the match between New South Wales and Cricket Australia XI. Across six matches in the tournament he was involved in 19 dismissals.

Retirement

In April 2022, Nevill announced his retirement from cricket. Nevill was New South Wales most capped Sheffield Shield captain.

International career
Nevill was selected to go to England for the 2015 Ashes series, and made his Test debut for the second Test at Lord's after Brad Haddin made himself unavailable for selection due to family reasons. His baggy green cap was presented by Steve Waugh. Nevill finished with seven catches on debut, and seven dismissals overall, to be tied for second for catches overall, but an Ashes debut record. He also scored 45 runs in the first innings, just missing his first half-century on debut, however he went on to score 57 in the second innings of his third Test at Edgbaston.

On 9 January 2016, Nevill made his debut for Melbourne Renegades as teammate Matthew Wade, Australia's limited-overs wicket-keeper was called up for international duties. Nevill ran himself out after Adam Zampa was hit on the nose off his deflection from a shot from Dwayne Bravo, as it went on to hit the stumps.

On 9 February 2016, a day after Australia lost the Chappell-Hadlee series to New Zealand, Nevill was named as the wicketkeeper of choice for ICC World T20 after Matthew Wade was dropped for poor glovesmanship. Despite his modest batting average, it was speculated that with a deep T20 batting lineup, the side could afford a specialist wicket-keeper.

Batting against Sri Lanka in July 2016, Peter Nevill along with Steve O'Keefe set the record for the slowest partnership in the history of test cricket for any wicket with a scoring rate of just 0.13 for the 9th wicket (4 runs off 174 balls).

In November 2016, Nevill was dropped from the Test side after the second Test of the South Africa series and replaced with Matthew Wade. A week later he made 179* in a Sheffield Shield match.

References

External links

 

1985 births
Living people
Australian cricketers
Australia Test cricketers
Australia Twenty20 International cricketers
New South Wales cricketers
Sydney Sixers cricketers
Melbourne Renegades cricketers
Cricketers from Melbourne
Melbourne Cricket Club cricketers
Wicket-keepers
Melbourne Stars cricketers
People from Hawthorn, Victoria